Aiman Hakim bin Ridza Abdoh (born 17 January 1989) is a Malaysian actor and singer. He rose to fame in Malaysian entertainment showbiz when he became a contestant of the TV3's reality television series, Mentor Season 5 and best known for his role in hit television series Vanila Coklat, and became best known for his leading roles in Diandra, Projek Memikat Suami, Selamat Pengantin Madu, Isteri Separuh Masa, Urusan Hati Cik Drama Queen and Girlfriend Aku Dari Neraka The Series.

Early life
Aiman was born on 17 January 1989, in Johor Bahru, Johor, Malaysia. He is the third of four siblings and has a mixed Malay-Arab parentage, his father is Malay and mother is Arab. He lived in Johor until 1990, then moved to Penang in 1994 before he settled in the Shah Alam and Subang Jaya. He attended SS 17 Subang Jaya Primary School at primary level, then he continued his studies at Subang Utama High School and now he already graduated from Sunway College, majoring in accounting, Association of Chartered Certified Accountants (ACCA). Before debuting as an actor and singer, he was a part-time model. He has been involved in advertising such as Brylcreem, Celcom, Milo and McDonald's. He was also appointed as the brand ambassador and model for Garnier Men in 2014.

Career

Career as footballer
Prior to his showbiz career, Aiman began his early career in sports as a footballer. He used to be the team captain of Primary Schools Football Championship Malaysia representing Selangor in 2001 when he was 12 years old.

Between 2004 and 2005, he played football to representing Malaysia in Youth World Cup under 17 (FIFA) at Tokyo, Japan. He also became the representative of Malaysia in various international football competition (under 17) at Jakarta, Indonesia; Bangkok, Thailand; Hong Kong and others. He did play with Bunyamin Omar and Asrarudin Putra Omar who later have professional football career with national team and Selangor.

Career as singer and actor
In 2011, Aiman became a participant in the singing competition Mentor organised by TV3 for its fifth season under the guidance of Rahim Maarof, influential singers and musicians in Malaysia. Aiman made it through to the fourth round before being eliminated.

Mentor performances

Aiman's first drama, Vanila Coklat, which aired on TV3 in 2011, brought him back to the public's attention. After the drama ended, he acted in a few television series and a telemovie drama.

In 2012, he produced a single called "Khalimah Janji" with Ernie Zakri song by Manusia Putih and lyric by Budhi Hekayat. Soon he produced another single called "Buatmu Cinta" OST for Astro Ria drama "Projek Memikat Suami", written by Adi 6ixth Sense.

Personal life
In February 2014, Aiman revealed that he had been in a relationship with actress and model Nur Fathia over the past year. However, their relationship was ended in December 2015. He chose to remain silent and refused to give any statements regarding their breakup.

In December 2018, Aiman and Zahirah MacWilson hinted on their Instagram account that they were in a relationship. On 8 June 2019, Aiman announced on his Instagram account that he and Zahirah were engaged.

Aiman and his now wife, Zahirah MacWilson, were married on 20 February 2020. They announced on their Instagram account that they had already gotten married, and posted their solemnization photos.

On 8 January 2021, Aiman and Zahirah posted on their Instagram account that they had welcomed a baby boy on 5 January 2021 at 2.26pm in Perth, Australia.

On 5 March 2021, Aiman and Zahirah revealed their son name, Isaac Raees, for the first time on their Instagram account.

Filmography

Film

Television series

Telemovie

Television show

Web series

Theatre

Discography

Soundtrack appearances

Philanthropy and endorsement
In April 2012, Aiman alongside Nazim Othman, Fizo Omar, Zoey Rahman, Intan Ladyana and Neelofa was appointed as the Young Biz Icons for Oxford Centre of Excellence (Oxcell). According to Oxcell, "The appointment of six icons was based on academic success and career development in the arts". Through this program, the celebrity icons will share their experiences throughout involved in the world of business and the arts.

In July 2013, the Malaysian private, free-to-air television channel TV3 appointed Aiman along with Adi Putra, Nora Danish, Fiza Sabjahan, Amar Asyraf, Nelydia Senrose, Tasha Shilla and Neelofa as the ambassador for Anugerah Syawal 2013. According to TV3, "The appointment of these celebrities is to promote programs on television and radio throughout the month of Syawal".

In January 2014, Aiman and Zara Zya was appointed as the Promotional Ambassador of Drama Festival Kuala Lumpur (DFKL) 2014. He responsible for promoting DFKL 2014 through social networking sites, participate in the roadshow, workshops and DFKL Awards 2014.

Awards and nominations

References

External links 
 

1989 births
People from Johor Bahru
Living people
Malaysian people of Malay descent
Malaysian Muslims
Malaysian people of Arab descent
Malaysian male actors
21st-century Malaysian male actors
Malaysian male film actors
Malaysian male television actors
Malaysian television personalities
Malaysian male models
Malaysian male pop singers
Malay-language singers